Jila Mossaed Estakhri (born 4 April 1948) is an Iranian-born Swedish writer. Born in Tehran, she was named a new member of the Swedish Academy on 4 October 2018, and was formally inducted into the Academy on 20 December 2018.

Mossaed has lived in Sweden in exile from Iran since 1986. She resides in Gothenburg, and writes in both Swedish and Persian.
On 5 October 2018, Mossaed was named a new member of the Swedish Academy together with Supreme Court justice Eric M. Runesson. She replaced author Kerstin Ekman, who ended her involvement with the Academy in 1989 over its handling of the Rushdie affair (and formally resigned in 2018), on seat 15.

Mossaed's poetry has been translated into Dutch, English, French, and Greek.

References

1948 births
Living people
People from Tehran
Iranian emigrants to Sweden
Members of the Swedish Academy
20th-century Persian-language writers
Swedish-language writers
20th-century Swedish women writers
20th-century Swedish writers
21st-century Swedish women writers
21st-century Swedish writers
21st-century Persian-language writers